Perikles or Pericles or Periklis is a Greek masculine given name.

Notable people with the given name include

Ancient world
 Pericles (circa 495-429 BC), Athenian statesman, orator and general
 Pericles the Younger (440s–406 BCE), Athenian general, illegitimate son of the above
 Pericles, Dynast of Lycia (circa 380-360 BC), Dynast of Lycia

Modern world
 Periklis Bousinakis, Greek footballer
 Periklis Dorkofikis, Greek basketball player
 Periklis Hristoforidis, Greek film actor
 Perikles Ioannidis (1881-1965), Greek admiral
 Perikles Kakousis (1879-?), Greek weightlifter
 Perikles Pierrakos-Mavromichalis, 19th century Greek fencer
 Periklis Panagopoulos, Greek shipping magnate
 Périclès Pantazis, Greek impressionist painter
 Periklis Papapostolou, Greek footballer
 Pericles A. Sakellarios (1905-1985), Greek architect
 Péricles (cartoonist) (1924-1961), full name Péricles de Andrade Maranhão, Brazilian cartoonist
 Periklis Iakovakis, Greek hurdler
 Péricles (singer) (born 1969), full name Péricles Aparecido Fonseca da Faria, Brazilian singer and instrumentalist
 Pericles (footballer, born 1975), full name Pericles de Oliveira Ramos, Brazilian football defender
 Pericles (footballer, born 1989), full name Junior Pericles Pinto Catarina, Brazilian football attacking midfielder
 Péricles (footballer, born 1994), full name Péricles da Silva Nunes, Brazilian football defensive midfielder

Greek masculine given names